Casey Frey is an American dancer and comedian notable for his videos on social media, particularly Vine.

Early life and social media
Frey grew up in Mendocino County, California, where he has stated he made videos with his brother for family and friends growing up before turning to Vine, where he initially made videos of himself dancing. Frey had over 250,000 followers on Vine before the app's shutdown in January 2017. In May 2019, a video set to the song "GOMF" by Dvbbs in which Frey as "a version of himself wearing sunglasses mocks [a clone of himself] for chopping wood and dancing, [and] a third Frey donning an open button-up and a bucket hat takes notice and intervenes" went viral. The video inspired numerous subsequent remakes and parodies on TikTok in 2020.

Dancing
In response to his viral video featuring the song, Dvbbs enlisted Frey to star in the music video for "GOMF", where he played a "leather-jacketed man who runs the mechanical bull ride and speaks in the goofy German accent". Frey has also appeared in the film Mainstream by Gia Coppola, and as the main performer in the music video for "The Business" by Tiësto.  Frey's dancing is also featured in the music video for "Bedroom Eyes" by The Knocks.

Personal life 
In June 2021, Frey came out as bisexual in a podcast interview.

References

Vine (service) celebrities
American male dancers
Living people
Bisexual men
American comedians
1993 births
21st-century LGBT people
Bisexual comedians
LGBT people from California
American LGBT comedians